Arochukwu Local Government Area, sometimes referred to as Arochuku or Aro Oke-Igbo, is the third largest local government area in Abia State (after Aba and Umuahia) in southeastern Nigeria and homeland of the Igbo subgroup, Aro people.

It is composed of five clans namely Abam, Aro, Ihechiowa, Ututu and Isu. Arochukwu is a principal historic town in Igbo land. It was also one of the cities in the Southern protectorate targeted by the British colonial government. Several historic tourist sites exist in the city. The mystic Ibini Ukpabi shrine, the slave routes and other relics of the slave trade era are frequently visited by tourists. It is also in the food belt of Abia state where most of the staple foods are produced.

History 

Arochukwu was home to a clan of the Ibibios, they founded the early states of Obong Okon Ita and Ibom.  Many years passed, migrants that had settled in the area rebelled over the reign of the ruling clan chief in connivance with the younger brother of the ruling family.  The first Igbo group was the Ezeagwu group led by their leader Agwu Inobia.  As Aro-Ibibio wars occurred, there was a stalemate. In reaction, the Eze Agwu clan invited a priest named Nnachi from the Edda clan of northeastern Igboland and another group from the east of the Cross River through Nnachi.  These people were identified as the Akpa people. Akpa forces led by Osim and Akuma Nnubi, they helped the rebellious group capture the rest of the area.  This formed the alliance of 19 new and old states in the area known as the Arochukwu kingdom around 1650–1700. The first king (or Eze Aro) of a unified Arochukwu was Akuma but after his death, Nnachi son's Oke Nnachi took over and his descendants have the throne to this day.

By the mid-18th century, Arochukwu people founded many other communities both within and outside Igboland. These migrations, influence of their god Ibini Ukpabi through priests, and their military power backed up by alliances with several related neighboring Igbo and eastern Cross River militarized states (particularly Ohafia, Abam, Abiriba, Afikpo, Ekoi, etc.) quickly established the Aro Confederacy as a regional economic power. However, Aro economic hegemony was threatened by the penetration of Europeans, mainly British colonists in the wake of the 20th century. Tensions finally led to bloodshed and the Anglo-Aro War took place from 1901 to 1902. The Aro Confederacy stoutly resisted but were eventually defeated. This helped the British to occupy the rest of what is now known as Eastern Nigeria.

Demography
The kingdom is Igbo mixed with Ibibio and Akpa. The main language in Arochukwu is Igbo while Ibibio is also spoken.

The population of Arochukwu town is 10,776. The local government area had a population of 193,820 in 2011, up from 97,800 in 1991.

Languages
The languages spoken in Arochukwu LGA are,
Igbo
Ibuoro
Nkari

Etymology
Aro translates as Children and Chukwu as God.
Put together this could imply Children of God.

Notable people 
Mazi Alvan Ikoku, OBE educationist (1900–1971)
Chief Dr. Daniel Chimezie Okeke (Mezie Abia, Omereoha 1) Business mogul, Philanthropist and politician
Nwankwo Kanu, footballer
Chidi Imoh, athlete
Alexx Ekubo, Actor and Model
Nnamdi Udoh, aeronautic engineer
Margaret Manson Graham (1860–1933), Scottish missionary nurse who died at Arochukwu
Mao Ohuabunwa, Industrialist and Politician
Benjamin Okike, Computer Scientist 
Dr. Phillips Nto, Politician and Academician
Chief Stephen Kālu Nwankwo (Nnanyere Ugo 1)
Rosemary Inyama (born 11 November 1903),educator, politician, businesswoman and community developer
Chief Okwara Ndubuisi (Ohachirieze) Businessman, philanthropist and politician.
Chief Charles Nwankwo (Ikenga Ututu) Engineer

References

Towns in Abia State
Aros
Local Government Areas in Abia State
Cities in Abia State